Princeps prior was a high-ranking Roman centurion and a member of the legion. Each of the ten cohorts that made up a legion had at its head the rank of pilus prior followed by the princeps prior. There is some controversy as to the precise order of the ranks below the pilus prior but this rank was followed by princeps prior if the order is based on seniority.

The princeps prior – like the princeps posterior – was elevated from the common soldiers based on merit. He is chosen by the tribunes of soldiers or the Roman consul or proconsul.

History
The position reflects the Roman Republic tradition of arranging the legion into three lines: the pilani, the principes and the hastati. During the Republic, the princeps prior was the centurion in command of a manipulus (unit of two centuries) of principes (legionary heavy infantry).

See also

Fields, Nic (2009). Volume 37 of Battle Orders: The Roman Army of the Principate 27 BC-AD 117. Osprey Publishing. p. 34. .

References

Ancient Roman titles